Al-Adiliyah  is a Syrian village located in Markaz Rif Dimashq District, Rif Dimashq. It is located in Western Ghouta. According to the Syria Central Bureau of Statistics (CBS), Al-Adiliyah had a population of 4,438 in the 2004 census. It is located in the Kiswah subdistrict. To its west is Al-Horjelah.

History
In 1838, Eli Smith noted el-'Adiliyeh as being located east of the Hajj road.

References

Bibliography

Populated places in Markaz Rif Dimashq District